Brooke Victoria Anderson (born May 13, 1978) is a former co-host of The Insider, and is now a correspondent for Entertainment Tonight. Previously, she was a culture and entertainment anchor and producer for CNN and served as co-host for Showbiz Tonight on HLN. Based in CNN's Los Angeles, California bureau, Anderson joined the network in July 2000.

Anderson graduated in 2000 with honors from the University of Georgia's Henry W. Grady College of Journalism and Mass Communication with a bachelor's degree in broadcast journalism. She is a member of the Kappa Delta sorority.

She has covered numerous events for CNN and Headline News, including the 2006 Cannes film festival, the Academy Awards, the Emmys, the Golden Globes, the Sundance Film Festival, the MTV Video Music Awards, the NBA All-Star Weekend, Fall Fashion Week in New York City and Atlanta's Music Midtown.

In February 2003, she received the Daily Point of Light Award for volunteerism from President George W. Bush.

In January 2012, she guest starred on Days of Our Lives, playing a reporter who interviewed John Black in episode 11754.

Personal life
She is married to James Arthur "Jim" Walker, III. They have three children: daughters, Kate Victoria, born in 2009, and Lily Georgina, born in 2013, and son James, born in April 2016.

References

External links

 Brooke Anderson profile on CNN.com

1978 births
Living people
American television reporters and correspondents
American women television journalists
CNN people
Journalists from California
People from Savannah, Georgia
Television anchors from Atlanta
Television anchors from Los Angeles
University of Georgia alumni
21st-century American women